Sesekinika is an unincorporated community in geographic Maisonville Township, in the Unorganized West Part of Timiskaming District in northeastern Ontario, Canada.

The community is located along the Ontario Northland Railway at the eastern terminus of Ontario Highway 570.

References

Other map sources:

Communities in Timiskaming District